The 2007 McDonald's All-American Boys Game was an All-star basketball game played on Wednesday, March 28, 2007 at Freedom Hall in Louisville, Kentucky, home of the University of Louisville Cardinals. The game's rosters featured the best and most highly recruited high school boys graduating in 2007.  The game was the 30th annual version of the McDonald's All-American Game first played in 1978.

The 48 players were selected from 2,500 nominees by a committee of basketball experts. They were chosen not only for their on-court skills, but for their performances off the court as well. Coach Morgan Wootten, who had more than 1,200 wins as head basketball coach at DeMatha High School, was chairman of the selection committee. Legendary UCLA coach John Wooden, who has been involved in the McDonald's All American Games since its inception, served as chairman of the Games and as an advisor to the selection committee.

Proceeds from the 2007 McDonald's All American High School Basketball Games went to Ronald McDonald House Charities (RMHC) of Kentuckiana and its Ronald McDonald House program.

2007 game
The game was telecast live by ESPN.  The crowd at Freedom Hall was electric as super-producer Timbaland took the court with the All American girls for a halftime performance to remember. That atmosphere carried over into an exciting second half of basketball, as the 30th annual Boys Game went down to the wire.

J. J. Hickson (Denver Nuggets) scored a team-high 14 points, while shooting 78% from the field, for the East squad. Naismith Sportsmanship Award winner Gani Lawal (Olimpia Milano) recorded a double-double with 12 points and 12 rebounds. Nick Calathes (Memphis Grizzlies) contributed with a solid performance, as he scored 13 points (3-3 from beyond the arc), grabbed 5 rebounds and dished out 6 assists.

The West Team was led by Michael Beasley (Miami Heat), as he tallied 23 points and 12 rebounds. Both of those totals place Beasley in the record books and for that he was crowned the John R. Wooden MVP of the game. Wootten Award winner Kevin Love (Minnesota Timberwolves) proved he was deserving of the honor, as he added 13 points and 6 rebounds. Long-range specialist Jerryd Bayless (Boston Celtics) added 11 points and was a perfect 2–2 from three-point range.

Shooting 54% from the field and 42% from three-point land, the West team took an 11-point lead into the locker room. A strong defensive effort by the East team in the second half helped keep the game close. The West squad was limited to just one three-point basket and three free throws in the second half. Held scoreless from the 2:31 mark on, the West relied on solid defense and an errant shot by O. J. Mayo (Milwaukee Bucks) at the buzzer to escape with the 114–112 victory.

2007 West roster

2007 East Roster

(* = starting line-up)

Coaches
The West team was coached by:
 Head Coach Derrick Taylor of William Howard Taft High School (Woodland Hills, California)
 Asst Coach Yutaka Shimizu of William Howard Taft High School (Woodland Hills, California)
 Asst Coach Jacob Pollon of William Howard Taft High School (Woodland Hills, California)

The East team was coached by:
 Co-Head Coach Gary Forrest of Oldham County High School (Buckner, Kentucky)
 Co-Head Coach Steve Wright of South Laurel High School (London, Kentucky)
 Asst Coach Mike Listerman of Covington Catholic High School (California, Kentucky)

Boxscore

Visitors: West

Home: East

(* = Starting Line-up)

All-American Week

Schedule

 Tuesday, March 27: Powerade Jamfest
 Slam Dunk Contest
 Three-Point Shoot-out
 Timed Basketball Skills Competition
 Wednesday, March 28: 30th Annual Boys All-American Game

The Powerade JamFest is a skills-competition evening featuring basketball players who demonstrate their skills in three crowd-entertaining ways.  The slam dunk contest was first held in 1987, and a 3-point shooting challenge was added in 1989.  This year, for the first time, a timed basketball skills competition was added to the schedule of events.

Contest winners
 The 2007 Powerade Slam Dunk contest was won by Blake Griffin.
 Chris Wright was winner of the 2007 3-point shoot-out.
 The skills competition was won by Nolan Smith.
 These events were held at Knights Hall on the campus of Louisville's Bellarmine University.

See also
2007 McDonald's All-American Girls Game

References

External links
McDonald's All-American on the web

2006–07 in American basketball
2007
Basketball competitions in Louisville, Kentucky
McDonalds, Boys